King Aroo is an American comic strip written and drawn by Jack Kent, which made its debut on November 13, 1950 and ran until June 19, 1965. The strip was distributed through the McClure Syndicate.

Characters and story
The strip's central character, King Aroo, is the monarch of the mythical Myopia. Supporting characters included Yupyop, Lord High Almost Everything; scientific expert Professor Yorgle; Mr. Pennipost, the kangaroo mailman with an astounding pocket capacity; Mr. Elephant, so forgetful he doesn't recall himself; nosy court poet Dipody Distich and Wanda Witch, a bird who pushes a cart marked with "Spells and Curses, 5¢" signage.

Often compared to Walt Kelly's Pogo, Kent's strip abounded in sophisticated puns and wordplay. The strip was described in The Smithsonian Collection of Newspaper Comics:

Kent and his wife June Kent named their home on the banks of the San Antonio River "King Aroo's Castle."

Collections and reprints 

The early strips were collected in a 192-page book, King Aroo, published by Doubleday in 1953. The collection had an introduction by Gilbert Seldes.

In April 2010, IDW Publishing and The Library of American Comics released the first volume of an intended complete reprint of King Aroo, with the first volume covering dailies and Sundays from 1950 through 1952. The series is edited and designed by Dean Mullaney with biographical text by Bruce Canwell and an introduction by Sergio Aragones. IDW had difficulty locating certain strips, causing the next volume to be delayed; however, by March 2013 the strips of 1953–54 were also available in book form.

References

External links
 Internet Book List: King Aroo
 Jack Kent Papers, University of Minnesota

American comic strips
1950 comics debuts
1965 comics endings
Fictional kings
American comics characters
Gag-a-day comics
Fantasy comics